Sir John Colshull (c. 1391 – 5 July 1418), of Tremodret in Duloe and Binnamy in Week St. Mary, Cornwall was an English Member of Parliament for Cornwall in April and November 1414. He was the son of John Colshull, who was also a Member of Parliament.

References

1391 births
1418 deaths
English MPs April 1414
Members of the pre-1707 English Parliament for constituencies in Cornwall
English MPs November 1414